Dicranomyia (Dicranomyia) veda is a species of fly from the family Limoniidae. This species is native to the Indomalayan realm.

References

Limoniidae
Insects described in 1966